Igreja de Vilar de Frades is a church in Barcelos, Portugal. It is classified as a National Monument.

Churches in Braga District
National monuments in Braga District
Buildings and structures in Barcelos, Portugal